The A9 (CREL / Lisbon Regional Outer Circular) is a Portuguese motorway which, as the name indicates, forms a partial outer circular route beyond the north and western parts of the Lisbon conurbation. It thereby links the Estoril coastal area with principal highways towards the north of the country.

Route description 
The road begins near to the National Stadium of Jamor and sets off in an approximately east-north-easterly direction, intersecting along the way with major regional roads ( IC19, A16, IC22 ) as well as two national motorways, the A8 and the A10. It passes Queluz in the edge of Sintra, then through the Amadora, Odivelas and Loures municipalities before ending after  at an intersection with the country's principal northbound highway, the A1.

Despite running for its entire length within  of central Lisbon, much of the route of the A9 is semi-urban or rural, incorporating mountainous regions that necessitated the inclusion of 15 viaducts and two substantial tunnels in its construction. It therefore is a very hilly road, with several tight turns along its way.

History 
The most westerly  of the A9 were opened in 1994, with the remaining  opening in September 1995. There was an idea to extend the westerly portion of the ring highway southwards across an additional bridge, but extending the A9 in this way appears not to have evolved beyond the status of an ambitious line on the map, and a second major highway bridge crossing the Tagus to the east of Lisbon has been constructed in the interim. The A9 is operated by Portugal's principal highway operator Brisa. When opened, it was toll motorway, but tolls were abolished in December 1995 by the government of António Guterres. In January 2003 the government of José Manuel Durão Barroso re-introduced tolls, a decision which was controversial.  the charge for a passenger car to travel the full  from one end of the road to the other is €2.95.

January 2010 
In the middle of the afternoon on 24 January 2010, near Belas, next to the junction with the newly opened the A16 a violent landslip deposited a large quantity of rocks and mud on the road. There is no record of any resulting road accident, but for more than a month the road was unusable and traffic had to be diverted, leading to serious congestion. Repairs were completed and the road fully repaired in time for it to be reopened on 25 February 2010.

External links 
The A9 on Google StreetView

Motorways in Portugal